Solute carrier family 22, member 4, also known as SLC22A4, is a human gene; the encoded protein is known as the ergothioneine transporter.

Function 
The encoded protein is an integral protein of the plasma membrane containing 12 transmembrane segments. The first functional designation of this protein was OCTN1 ("organic cation transporter, novel, type 1"), but efficiency of transport for organic cations (e.g., tetraethylammonium) is very low. The transport efficiency for carnitine is also negligible. Instead, the protein is responsible for the cotransport of sodium ions and ergothioneine, which is an antioxidant, into cells. Thus, a more appropriate functional designation is ETT ("ergothioneine transporter").

Interactions 
SLC22A4 has been shown to interact with PDZK1.

See also 
 Solute carrier family

References

Further reading 

 
 
 
 
 
 
 
 
 
 
 
 
 
 
 

Solute carrier family